The Catholic Church in Djibouti is part of the worldwide Catholic Church, under the spiritual leadership of the Pope in Rome.

There are around 5,000 Catholics and five Catholic parishes all over the country - just less than 1% of the total population.  The country forms a single, exempt diocese - the Diocese of Djibouti.

See also
 List of Catholic dioceses in Somalia and Djibouti
 Roman Catholic Diocese of Djibouti

References

Sources and external links 
 GCatholic
 http://www.gcatholic.org/dioceses/diocese/djib0.htm

 
Djibouti
Djibouti